, also known as Satanikus!, is a Japanese horror-comedy anime and manga series created by Go Nagai. It's one of Nagai's most famous works in Japan, although not very well known in the rest of the world. In 2006, it would get a sequel/remake in Demon Prince Enma, which drops the comedy and becomes a full-fledged suspense-horror series. After the OVA was released, another manga version was released called Satanikus ENMA Kerberos by Eiji Toriyama. A remake entitled Ghastly Prince Enma Burning Up aired in Japan in 2011.

Plot
Enma, Yukiko-Hime and Kapaeru are part of the Yokai-Patrol. They go after ghosts that have escaped from Hell into the human world.

Characters

 The hot-headed, perverted protagonist, sent by his uncle to arrest yokai that have infiltrated the human world, though most often then not he ends up going overboard and killing them instead. He has long eyebrows that can detect a yokai's presence and wields a powerful cape and a fiery staff which can transform into a massive hammer.

 A beautiful Yuki-onna princess who is in love with Enma, but often has to put up with his pervertedness. She has powerful ice powers, though more often than not gets captured in a fanserviceable manner.

 Half kappa, half water sprite. He is the third member of the Yokai Patrol. He doesn't have a lot of attacks, but still provides some help in battle. He's often confused for a frog, which makes him very angry. His name is a portmanteau of 'kappa' and 'kaeru' ("frog" in Japanese).

 An "old man" yokai who looks like a hat and guides Enma-kun. His name is a portmanteau of 'chapeau' and 'ouji' ("old man" in Japanese).

 A human boy that befriends the Yokai Patrol. He attends the local elementary school, and always gets attacked by demons. He is a side character in the 2011 anime.

 Tsutomu's teacher. He's merely a comic relief, and always yelling at Tsutomu-kun.

 A homeless deadbeat, Daracura was originally an officer for Enma-Daiou. After losing his position of officer, Daracura tried throughout the series to kill Enma-kun. However, as the series progressed Daracura became less important.

 Tsutomu's girlfriend. Her mother has passed on, and lives with her father in an apartment complex. She replaces Tsutomu as one of the main protagonists in the 2011 anime.

 The Judge of Hell and Enma's uncle. He sends Enma-kun and his friends to arrest demons on Earth.

 Enma's sister; the protagonist of the spin-off manga, Dororon Enbi-chan, and an antagonist in the 2011 anime. She has her own versions of Yukiko-Hime and Kappaeru named Yukiko-Hige and Kapaku.

Media

Anime

An original video animation of the sequel manga, Demon Prince Enma, was produced by Brain's Base and was released in four volumes released between August 25, 2006 and March 23, 2007. The OVA is licensed in North America by Bandai Entertainment. A remake of the original series, titled , was produced by Brain's Base and aired on MBS between April 7, 2011 and June 24, 2011. Yoko. NIS America licensed the series in North America under the title Ghastly Prince Enma Burning Up and released the series on subtitled DVD and Blu-ray Disc on September 11, 2012.

Manga

Besides Weekly Shōnen Sunday version, other serializations were published at the time in various Shogakukan's children magazines and in Tokuma Shoten's TV Land, drawn by Nagai and several of his assistants.

Volumes
The series published in Weekly Shōnen Sunday has been compiled in volumes several times.

This version is also available in ebook format, published by ebookjapan.

Sequels

Short stories
, a one-shot story, was published in the  issue of Asahi Sonorama' Manga Shōnen. In this story, the characters are older. Since its publication, this manga has been compiled in all tankōbon as the last story with the title .

Dororon Enbi-chan
This is an adult-restricted erotic comedy.

Volumes

Kikoushi Enma

Satanikus ENMA Kerberos

Shururun Yukiko Hime-chan: feat. Dororon Enma-kun
 is a seinen manga written and drawn by Sae Amatsu and released alongside Dororon Enma-kun Meeramera.

Volumes

References

External links
Dororon Enma-kun at The World of Go Nagai webpage 
Satanikus! at D/visual 
Dororon Enma-kun Toei Animation Website Official site (TV) 
Dororon Enma-kun Meeramera official website 
Dororon Enma-kun Meeramera official website 

1973 anime television series debuts
1973 manga
2010 manga
2011 anime television series debuts
Asahi Sonorama manga
Brain's Base
Comedy anime and manga
Go Nagai
Horror anime and manga
Kadokawa Shoten manga
Mainichi Broadcasting System original programming
Shogakukan manga
Shueisha manga
Shōnen manga
Seinen manga
Toei Animation television
TBS Television (Japan) original programming
Yōkai in anime and manga